The Idaho House of Representatives is the lower chamber of the Idaho State Legislature. It consists of 70 representatives elected to two-year terms. The state is divided into 35 districts, each of which elects two representatives to separate seats. It meets at the Idaho State Capitol in Boise, Idaho, in the State Capitol Building.

Composition of the House 
The Idaho House of Representatives has been continuously controlled by the Republican Party since the late 1950s, usually by a wide margin. Democrats picked up six seats in the 2006 elections. In the 2010 elections Republicans won back many of those seats, gaining five. In the 2012 elections, the first election after redistricting in 2011, Democrats gained two seats in Ada County, but Republicans offset those gains by winning a seat in Bannock County and a seat in the district representing the Democratic stronghold Blaine County. In 2014, two Republican incumbents representing swing districts in North Central Idaho lost re-election, but picked up one seat previously held by a Democrat in the same region for net loss for Republicans of one seat.

Leadership in the 65th Legislature

Members of the Idaho House of Representatives

Past composition of the House of Representatives

See also
Idaho Senate

References

External links
Idaho State Legislature official website

State lower houses in the United States
Idaho Legislature